Wild Water (German: Wilde Wasser) is a 1962 Austrian-West German drama film directed by Rudolf Schündler and starring Marianne Hold, Hans von Borsody and Corny Collins. It was part of the post-war boom in heimatfilm.

The film's sets were designed by the art director Hans Zehetner.

Cast
 Marianne Hold as Magdalena Ullmann  
 Hans von Borsody as Thomas Mautner  
 Corny Collins as Andrea Sternberg  
 Ruth Stephan as Johanna 
 Ingeborg Gruber as Monika Böhmel  
 Friedrich Schoenfelder as Baron Ferdinand von Lindner 
 Sieghardt Rupp as Markus Mautner 
 Beppo Brem as Fabian  
 Franz Muxeneder as Siegfried 'Sigi' Reiber  
 Rolf Olsen as Sternberg  
 Viktor Staal as Förster Böhmel  
 Heinrich Gretler as Mautner sr.  
 Silvia Simon 
 Susanne von Ratony 
 Harry Engel 
 Sergio Casmai

References

Bibliography 
 Bock, Hans-Michael & Bergfelder, Tim. The Concise CineGraph. Encyclopedia of German Cinema. Berghahn Books, 2009.

External links 
 

1962 films
1962 drama films
Austrian drama films
German drama films
West German films
1960s German-language films
Films directed by Rudolf Schündler
Films set in the Alps
1960s German films